Edmonton Strathcona (formerly known as Edmonton—Strathcona) is a federal electoral district in Alberta, Canada, that has been represented in the House of Commons of Canada since 1953. It spans the south central part of the city of Edmonton. Edmonton Strathcona was the only federal riding in Alberta not held by the Conservative Party between 2008 and 2015 and since 2019.

Geography
The riding is home to most of Edmonton's francophones. The historic district of Old Strathcona, the University of Alberta, the University of Alberta Campus Saint-Jean and the Mackenzie Health Sciences Centre are all located in the riding.

Edmonton Strathcona encompasses the neighbourhoods of Allendale, Argyll, Avonmore, Belgravia, Bonnie Doon, Capilano, Cloverdale, Empire Park, Forest Heights, Fulton Place, Garneau, Gold Bar, Grandview Heights, Hazeldean, Holyrood, Idylwylde, Kenilworth, King Edward Park, Lansdowne, Lendrum Place, Malmo Plains, McKernan, Ottewell, Parkallen, Pleasantview, Queen Alexandra Park, Ritchie, Riverdale, Strathcona, Strathearn, Terrace Heights, and Windsor Park.

It borders on the federal ridings of Edmonton Centre, Edmonton Griesbach, Sherwood Park—Fort Saskatchewan, Edmonton Mill Woods, and Edmonton Riverbend.

This district is bounded:
 On the north by the North Saskatchewan River (except for a jog that goes around the neighbourhood of Riverdale, which is north of the river).
 On the west by the Whitemud Creek from the North Saskatchewan River to Whitemud Drive.
 On the south by Whitemud Drive, from Whitemud Creek to the City Limits.
 On the east by Edmonton's City Limits.

Political geography
As evidenced by the 2008 and 2011 elections, this riding is heavily polarized between more urban NDP voters concentrated in the northwest of the riding and suburban Conservative voters concentrated in the south and east.

The NDP picked up this seat in 2008 for the first time in its history, when Edmonton lawyer Linda Duncan defeated Tory incumbent Rahim Jaffer, thanks to a consolidation of non-Conservative votes. They have retained the riding since and it has established itself as clearly the most left-leaning riding in Alberta.

Demographics
According to the Canada 2011 Census; 2013 representation

Ethnic groups: 79.2% White, 4.4% Chinese, 4.3% Aboriginal, 2.8% South Asian, 2.1% Filipino, 1.5% Black, 1.2% Latin American, 1.0% Arab 
Languages: 77.3% English, 3.8% French, 3.5% Chinese, 2.5% German, 1.5% Ukrainian, 1.3% Spanish, 1.3% Tagalog
Religions: 52.8% Christian (22.1% Catholic, 5.6% United Church, 3.5% Lutheran, 3.5% Anglican, 2.2% Baptist, 2.0% Christian Orthodox, 1.1% Pentecostal, 13.0% Other), 2.5% Muslim, 1.2% Hindu, 1.1% Buddhist, 40.6% No religion 
Median income (2010): $35,026 
Average income (2010): $46,710

History
The Strathcona riding dates back to Territorial times (see Strathcona (electoral district). It was represented by Liberal MPs, then a Liberal MP who after election became a Unionist, then a Conservative), and a United Farmer of Alberta MP in that early incarnation. (This riding was abolished in 1924 and its area was split among the Edmonton East, Edmonton West, Vegreville and Victoria ridings.)

The electoral district  of "Edmonton-Strathcona" (later Edmonton Strathcona) was created in 1952 from Edmonton East and Edmonton West ridings.

"Edmonton—Strathcona" gained territory from Edmonton East and was renamed "Edmonton Strathcona" during the 2012 electoral redistribution.

Members of Parliament

This riding has elected the following members of the House of Commons:

Current Member of Parliament
The current Member of Parliament is Heather McPherson of the New Democratic Party who was first elected in the 2019 federal election and re-elected in the 2021 federal election. Winning 61% of the district vote in 2021, McPherson holds the largest margin of victory among elected NDP MPs in the 44th parliament.

Election results

Edmonton Strathcona (2013–present)

Edmonton—Strathcona (1952-2013)

See also
 List of Canadian federal electoral districts
 Past Canadian electoral districts

Notes

References

External links
 2006 Election Resource wiki
 
 Expenditures - 2008
 Expenditures - 2004
 Expenditures - 2000
 Expenditures - 1997
 Elections Canada

Alberta federal electoral districts
Politics of Edmonton